Fashion Cares was an annual event held in Toronto, Ontario, Canada that seeks to raise awareness of HIV and AIDS, as well as raise funds for the AIDS Committee of Toronto (ACT). Since its inception in 1987, it, with assistance from local and national businesses, has raised over $10 million through banquets, auctions, and fashion shows. Fashion Cares ended in 2012.

External links
Fashion Cares Official Website

HIV/AIDS activism
Fashion events in Canada
LGBT culture in Toronto
LGBT events in Canada
Recurring events established in 1987
1987 establishments in Ontario
Annual events in Canada
HIV/AIDS in Canada